The Government Medical College, Jammu also known as GMC Jammu is a medical college located in Jammu, Jammu and Kashmir, India. It was established in 1973. The college and hospital are approved and recognized by the Medical Council of India since the year of inception of college.

Degree
GMC Jammu offers training courses and degrees in various disciplines like MBBS, BSC Paramedical courses, Post graduation, Physiotherapy, Anticillary Medical Training (AMT) etc.

Associated Hospitals
There are currently 05 associated hospitals with GMC, Jammu 
 Medical College Hospital
 SMGS Hospital
 Chest Disease Hospital
 Psychiatry Disease Hospital
 Super Speciality Hospital

References 

Universities and colleges in Jammu and Kashmir
Jammu Division
Jammu district
Medical colleges in Jammu and Kashmir